The 2015–16 NOJHL season is the 38th season of the Northern Ontario Junior Hockey League (NOJHL).

In March 2016, the top teams of each division play for the Copeland-McNamara Trophy, the NOJHL championship. The winner of the Copeland-McNamara Trophy will compete in the Central Canadian Junior "A" championship, the Dudley Hewitt Cup. The Kirkland Lake Gold Miners will automatically compete in the Dudley Hewitt Cup as they are the host team for 2016. If successful against the winners of the Ontario Junior Hockey League and Superior International Junior Hockey League, the Cup champion would then move on to play in the Canadian Junior Hockey League championship, the 2016 Royal Bank Cup.

Changes 
Abitibi Eskimos relocate to Timmins, Ontario and become the Timmins Rock.
Mattawa Blackhawks relocate to Iroquois Falls, Ontario and become Iroquois Falls Eskis.
Sudbury Nickel Barons relocate to Rayside-Balfour, Ontario and become Rayside-Balfour Canadians.
French River Rapids of Noelville, Ontario are granted expansion.
Espanola Express of Espanola, Ontario are granted expansion.
Soo Eagles rejoin league from North American Hockey League.

Standings
Final standings as of March 12, 2016.

x = clinched playoff berth; y = clinched division title; z = clinched league title

2016 Copeland-McNamara Trophy Playoffs

Playoff results are listed on the official league website.

2016 Dudley Hewitt Cup Championship
Hosted by the Kirkland Lake Gold Miners in Kirkland Lake, Ontario.

Awards
Top Defenceman (NOJHL Award) - Kyle Fransen, Rayside-Balfour Canadians
Most Improved (Gilles Laperriere Trophy) - Nathan Hebert, Soo Thunderbirds
Top Defensive Forward (Mitch Tetreault Memorial Trophy) - Brett Jeffries, Soo Thunderbirds
Team Goaltending (NOJHL Award) - Soo Thunderbirds
Top GAA (Wayne Chase Memorial Award) - Brendon Gordon, Soo Thunderbirds
Top Scorer (Jimmy Conners Memorial Trophy) - Brayden Stortz, Kirkland Lake Gold Miners
Most Valuable Player (Carlo Catterello Trophy) - Hunter Atchison, Cochrane Crunch
Top Rookie (John Grignon Trophy) - Bradley Chenier, Rayside-Balfour Canadians
Most Gentlemanly Player (Onaping Falls Huskies Trophy) - Brennan Kelly, French River Rapids
Top Team Player (NOJHL Trophy) - Hunter Atchison, Cochrane Crunch
Scholastic Award (NOJHL Trophy) - Brandon Grandinetti, Soo Thunderbirds
CJHL Scholastic Nominee Award - Brandon Grandinetti, Soo Thunderbirds
Playoff's Most Valuable Player (NOJHL Trophy) - Michael Caruso, Soo Thunderbirds
Coach of the Year (Mirl "Red" McCarthy Memorial Award) - Ryan Leonard, Cochrane Crunch
Top Executive (Joe Drago Trophy) - Jim Bruce, Powassen Voodoos

See also 
 2016 Royal Bank Cup
 Dudley Hewitt Cup
 List of NOJHL seasons
 Ontario Junior Hockey League
 Superior International Junior Hockey League
 Greater Ontario Junior Hockey League
 2015 in ice hockey
 2016 in ice hockey

References

External links 
 Official website of the Northern Ontario Junior Hockey League
 Official website of the Canadian Junior Hockey League

NOJ
2015